The 2013 Campeonato Mato-Grossense de Futebol was the 71st edition of the Mato Grosso's top professional football league. The competition began on January 20, and ended on May 5. Cuiabá Esporte Clube won the championship by the 4th time, while Vila Aurora was relegated. Atlético Campoverdense withdrawn their spot on the championship, so the championship had only one relegation spot and nine teams.

Format
On the first stage, all teams play against each other in a double round-robin. The worst team is relegated, and the top four teams qualify to the playoffs. The playoffs are two-leg matches.

Qualifications
The champion qualifies to the 2014 Copa do Brasil. The best team who isn't on Campeonato Brasileiro Série A, Série B or Série C qualifies to the Campeonato Brasileiro Série D.

Participating teams

First round

Standings

Results

Final stage

Semifinals

First leg

Second leg

Finals

Cuiabá won the 2013 Campeonato Mato-Grossense.

References

Mato-Grossense
2013